Douglass Hills is a home rule-class city in eastern Jefferson County, Kentucky, United States. The population was 5,484 at the 2010 census, down from 5,718 at the 2000 census.

History

Douglass Hills was farmland from 1813 until the 1970s. Some of it was owned by James J. Douglas from 1896 until his death in 1917. Douglass Hills was incorporated in 1973 as the farmland was turned into subdivisions, originally under the name "Douglass Place".

Geography
Douglass Hills is located in eastern Jefferson County at  (38.236070, -85.547641). It is bordered to the east and south by Middletown, to the west by Jeffersontown, to the northwest by Blue Ridge Manor and Sycamore, and to the north by Louisville.

U.S. Route 60 (Shelbyville Road) forms part of the northern boundary of Douglass Hills, leading east  to Shelbyville and west  to downtown Louisville.

Demographics

As of the census of 2000, there were 5,718 people, 2,428 households, and 1,626 families residing in the city. The racial makeup of the city was 89.28% White, 6.94% Black or African American, 0.05% Native American, 1.77% Asian, 0.07% Pacific Islander, 1.22% from other races, and 0.66% from two or more races. Hispanic or Latino of any race were 2.90% of the population.

There were 2,428 households, out of which 29.9% had children under the age of 18 living with them, 56.6% were married couples living together, 8.0% had a female householder with no husband present, and 33.0% were non-families. 27.9% of all households were made up of individuals, and 8.9% had someone living alone who was 65 years of age or older. The average household size was 2.36 and the average family size was 2.89.

In the city, the population was spread out, with 22.4% under the age of 18, 7.7% from 18 to 24, 28.3% from 25 to 44, 28.0% from 45 to 64, and 13.6% who were 65 years of age or older. The median age was 40 years. For every 100 females, there were 94.8 males. For every 100 females age 18 and over, there were 91.6 males.

The median income for a household in the city was $60,021, and the median income for a family was $73,670. Males had a median income of $51,566 versus $31,196 for females. The per capita income for the city was $31,994. About 1.6% of families and 3.0% of the population were below the poverty line, including 2.3% of those under age 18 and 4.6% of those age 65 or over.

References

External links
City of Douglass Hills official website

Cities in Kentucky
Cities in Jefferson County, Kentucky
Louisville metropolitan area
Populated places established in 1973
1973 establishments in Kentucky